Prostanthera scutata is a species of flowering plant in the family Lamiaceae and is endemic to Western Australia. It is a small, erect, compact shrub with densely hairy branches, elliptic to narrow elliptic leaves and pale blue or faintly violet flowers.

Description
Flowering occurs in October, December or January.

Taxonomy
Prostanthera scutata was first formally described in 1964 by Charles Austin Gardner in the Journal of the Royal Society of Western Australia from specimens he collected near the Hutt River.

Distribution and habitat
This mintbush grows in gravelly soil in the Avon Wheatbelt and Geraldton Sandplains biogeographic regions of Western Australia.

Conservation status
This mintbush is classified as "Priority Two" by the Western Australian Government Department of Parks and Wildlife meaning that it is poorly known and from only one or a few locations.

References

scutata
Eudicots of Western Australia
Lamiales of Australia
Plants described in 1942
Taxa named by Charles Gardner